Casimiro Miguel Vieira da Silva Ferreira (Rio de Janeiro, 20 October 1993), better known as Casimiro or Cazé, is a Brazilian journalist, presenter, sports commentator, digital influencer, YouTuber and streamer. In addition to making content for the internet on his Twitch and YouTube channels, he works on the De Sola, Ei Games and TNT Sports (Brazil) channels, all on YouTube. He is named as one of the biggest streamers in Brazil.

Career 
Born in Rio de Janeiro, son of Portuguese immigrants, Casimiro began to gain prominence first on the Esporte Interativo channel (today TNT Sports Brazil) presenting the program "EI Games", at the same time he participated in the youtube channel "De Sola", a skit humor channel and football content that also belongs to TNT Sports. Casimiro attended college in journalism, but did not finish it. In January 2019, he was invited to comment on SBT Sports Rio along with Pedro Certezas, to cover the vacation of the main commentators of the program.

Casimiro started to stand out two years later, in 2021, after starting to do daily lives on Twitch. With his catchphrase "meteu essa?" ("did you say that?"), which became a well-known meme on the Internet, he became a sensation by making his broadcasts in a relaxed way, mixing football with humor. With all this success, and with its peculiar, football content (a prominent theme in Brazil) and funny, it attracted a huge audience, most of which are younger, being considered one of the biggest streamers and the revelation of the year, in addition to being the fifth most watched in Brazil in the year.

Due to his rise in 2021, he was one of 15 nominees for the Comunique-se Award, in the category "Digital Influencer Journalist", won the iBest Award in the "Twitcher of the Year" category and won the eSports Brazil Award in the "Person of the Year" category (he was also nominated for the "Best Streamer of the Year" category, but did not win this one). It also reached the mark of 200 million views on its YouTube channel.

In January 2022, he announced that he would leave SBT to invest in other projects and on the 22nd of the same month, it was announced that Casimiro would broadcast 16 Campeonato Carioca games on his Twitch lives after closing a partnership with the company LiveMode, which is responsible for managing some championships such as Paulista and Copa do Nordeste.

After watching and reacting to the first episode of Netflix's "Neymar - O Caos Perfeito" series, Casimiro managed to beat the record for simultaneous viewers on Twitch in Brazil on 24 January 2022, with more than 545,000 people watching the broadcast, mark that made him reach first place in the largest national broadcasts on the platform, in addition to having also entered the top 10 peak viewership in the history of global Twitch, occupying the ninth place. In April 2022, he became the streamer with the most subscribers in the world, surpassing 97,000 users. On 19 May, Casimiro was banned from Twitch for 48 hours for copyright infringement, while streaming the best moments of the Europa League. He was unbanned after 3 hours and 27 minutes.

On 1 July, he announced that he would start a new channel and project on youtube, entitled "Que Papinho!", being a kind of program where Casimiro will interact with numerous personalities both from the world of football and abroad. On 4 November, Casimiro announced a partnership with FIFA to broadcast 22 games of the 2022 FIFA World Cup in Qatar in YouTube, Twitch and FIFA's own streaming service, FIFA+. On 24 November, during a game between Brazil and Serbia for Group G, Casimiro broke a worldwide record with more than 3.48 million viewers in his livestream in YouTube. The achievement was previously held by Brazilian sertanejo singer Marília Mendonça, with 3.31 million viewers during a livestream in 2020.

Notes

References 

Twitch (service) streamers
Brazilian comedians
Brazilian YouTubers
1993 births
Living people
People from Rio de Janeiro (city)
Brazilian people of Portuguese descent